Los Pinos or Playa Los Pinos is a village and coastal resort on the Río de la Plata in the Colonia Department of southwestern Uruguay. It is an eastern extension of Playa Fomento and Playa Britópolis, all of which have a small permanent population but form together a sizable summer resort with many streets and houses.

Population
In 2011 Los Pinos had a population of 193.
 
Source: Instituto Nacional de Estadística de Uruguay

References

External links
INE map of Playa Britopolis, Playa Azul, Playa Parant, Playa Foment and Los Pinos

Populated places in the Colonia Department
Seaside resorts in Uruguay